Gunther Baumann (19 January 1921 – 7 February 1998) was a German footballer and manager.

External links

1921 births
1998 deaths
German footballers
Association football midfielders
Germany international footballers
1. FC Lokomotive Leipzig players
Hannover 96 players
Stuttgarter Kickers players
1. FC Nürnberg players
German football managers
1. FC Nürnberg managers
Bundesliga managers
TSV 1860 Munich managers
VfB Stuttgart managers
VfR Mannheim managers
Alemannia Aachen managers